Adair County Courthouse may refer to:

 Adair County Courthouse (Iowa), Greenfield, Iowa
 Adair County Courthouse (Kentucky), Columbia, Kentucky
 Adair County Courthouse (Missouri), Kirksville, Missouri
 Adair County Courthouse (Oklahoma), Stilwell, Oklahoma